The Graduate School of Health Economics and Management (or ALTEMS) is a graduate school at the Università Cattolica del Sacro Cuore established in 2008 located in Italy.

Master's degrees
The School offers  master's degrees:
Organizzazione e gestione delle aziende e dei servizi sanitari
Valutazione e gestione delle tecnologie sanitarie
Pharmacy management - Organizzazione e gestione della farmacia
Esperto giuridico per l'azienda sanitaria
Management delle impresse biomediche e biotecnologiche
Competenze e servizi giuridici in sanità

References

External links
  

Università Cattolica del Sacro Cuore
Graduate schools in Italy
Universities and colleges in Rome
Health care management
Educational institutions established in 2008
2008 establishments in Italy
Medical and health organisations based in Italy